Baby, We're Ascending is the debut album from the Australian artist HAAi. The album was released on 27 May 2022.

Background and release
Baby, We're Ascending was announced on 23 February 2022 for release on 27 May. The announcement was accompanied by the lead single, "Bodies of Water". The second single, "Purple Jelly Disc" was released on 31 March, and the final single, the title track, was released on 5 May.

Critical reception
The Australian radio station Double J placed it at 20 on their top 50 best albums of 2022 list, with writer Phoebe Bennett praising the album's "transcending and euphoric soundscapes".

References

2022 albums
Electronic albums by Australian artists
Techno albums by Australian artists